The Fontanalba is a short mountain river that flows through the Alpes-Maritimes department of southeastern France. It flows in the mountains west of Tende. It is a tributary of the Bieugne, which is a tributary of the Roya. Together with the Vallée des merveilles on the west side of Mont Bégo, the Fontanalba valley forms a protected area, known for Bronze Age petroglyphs.

References

Rivers of France
Rivers of Alpes-Maritimes
Rivers of Provence-Alpes-Côte d'Azur